Scott Bolton may refer to:
 Scott Bolton (rugby league) (born 1987), Australian rugby league footballer
 Scott Bolton (American football) (born 1965), American football wide receiver
 Scott J. Bolton (born 1958), American theoretical and experimental space physicist